Aethes inexpecta is a species of moth of the family Tortricidae. It was described by Razowski in  1967. It is endemic to Argentina.

References

inexpecta
Moths described in 1967
Moths of South America
Taxa named by Józef Razowski